Lionel Hastie (5 June 1911 - 9 April 1981) was an Australian rules footballer, who played for the Fitzroy Football Club in the Victorian Football League (VFL).

Career
Hastie played 13 games for Fitzroy in the 1931 season, and scored 15 goals.

References

External links

1911 births
1981 deaths
Fitzroy Football Club players
Preston Football Club (VFA) players
Newtown Australian Football Club players
Australian rules footballers from New South Wales